Nilay Esen Ersun (born January 3, 1987) is a Turkish female long-distance runner specialized in marathon. She is a member of Bursa Büyülşehir Belediye SK.

In 2005, she received a two-year ban from the track due to positive testing for illegal substance Metenolone.

She took part at the 2015 Hamburg Marathon in Germany, and finished in 2:37:09, meeting the qualifying time standard for Olympics. So, she earned a quota spot for women's marathon in the 2016 Summer Olympics.

References

1987 births
People from Antakya
Turkish female long-distance runners
Turkish female marathon runners
Doping cases in athletics
Turkish sportspeople in doping cases
Living people
Bursa Büyükşehir Belediyespor athletes
20th-century Turkish sportswomen
21st-century Turkish sportswomen
Sportspeople from Hatay